Charles Benjamin Amirkhanian (born January 19, 1945; Fresno, California) is an American composer. He is a percussionist, sound poet, and radio producer of Armenian origin. He is mostly known for his electroacoustic and text-sound music. Performance artist Laurie Anderson praises his work: "The art of audio collage has been reinvented here... A brilliant sense of imaginary space."

Career 
Amirkhanian received his Master of Fine Arts from Mills College in 1980, where he studied electronic music and techniques of sound recording. He was music director of Pacifica Radio's KPFA-FM in Berkeley, California, from 1969 to 1992, and he was a lecturer in the Interdisciplinary Creative Arts Department at San Francisco State University from 1977 to 1980. He co-directed the Telluride Institute's Composer to Composer festival in Telluride, Colorado, between 1988 and 1991. Amirkhanian is the executive director and artistic director of the Other Minds Music Festival in San Francisco, which he co-founded with Jim Newman in 1992. He has played a key role in recording and championing the work of Conlon Nancarrow and George Antheil, among others.

In 1984, the American Music Center awarded him its Letter of Distinction for service to American composers through his work at KPFA FM in Berkeley, California. This was followed in 2005 by another for his co-founding and directing the Other Minds Festival in San Francisco. From ASCAP in 1989 he received the Deems Taylor Award, also for service to American composers. Amirkhanian received a 1997 Foundation for Contemporary Arts Grants to Artists Award. In 2009, Chamber Music America and ASCAP honored him for his Adventurous Programming of Contemporary Music with Other Minds.
In 2017, the American Composers Forum honored him with its Champion of New Music award.

Discography 

 10+2: 12 American Text-Sound Pieces (1975). 1750 Arch Records S-1752 (LP) reissued in 2003 on Other Minds/CD 1006-2 compilation which includes Amirkhanian's 'Just (1972)' and 'Heavy Aspirations (1973)
 Lexical Music (1979). 1750 Arch Records S-1779 (LP)
 Polipoetry Issues Numero 3: American Sound Poetry (1983). 3Vitre – EM 00383 (limited edition 7" LP) Compilation containing Amirkhanian's 'The Putts'
 Mental Radio: Nine Text-Sound Compositions (1985). CRI-SD 523 (LP); reissued in 2009 on New World Records NWCRL 523 (CD)
 Perspectives of New Music (1988). Compilation CD accompanying volume 26 issue. Contains: Pas de Voix (Portrait of Samuel Beckett)
 Charles Amirkhanian and Noah Creshevsky: Auxesis: Electroacoustic Music, Centaur Records 1995 – CRC 2194
 Walking Tune (1998). Starkland ST-206. "One of the Year's 20 best CDs," according to the Electronic Music Foundation.
 Charles Amirkhanian: Loudspeakers (2019). New World Records 80817 (2-CD set). "What links all these pieces is a creative ambiguity of genre, a delight in shifting back and forth between elements whose sources can be recognized and those whose can’t." – Kyle Gann
 Miatsoom (2021). Other Minds Records OM 1029-2 Contains: Dzarin Bess Ga Khorim, Roussier (not Rouffier), Three Armenians, & Miatsoom 
 Charles Amirkhanian & Carol Law Hypothetical Moments—Collaborative Works 1975-1985 (2022). Other Minds Records OM 4001 DVD. Video works by Carol Law, music by Amirkhanian. Contains: History of Collage, Audience, Tremolo Bank, Dog of Stravinsky, Maria, The Real Perpetual Mobile, Mahogany Ballpark, Hypothetical Moments (in the intellectual life of Southern California), Awe, And as, Dreams Freud Dreamed, Too True. 81 Minutes. All regions NTSC. “Though they fracture almost all of the rules, there remains a refined, classical undertone and motivation to their work. The resultant combination of voice and visual image was magical . . . Amirkhanian and Law presented a new approach to using the most classic instruments of all—the voice, the eyes and the ears . . . a fitting tribute to the brilliant potential of New Music.”  — Jack Kolkmeyer, The Santa Fe Reporter, 1983.

Partial list of works 

Tape works unless otherwise noted; † indicates optional live voice(s).

 Symphony I (for 13 players, 1965)
 Words (1969)
 Oratora Konkurso Rezulto: Autoro de la Jaro (Portrait of Lou Harrison, 1970)
 If In Is (1971)
 Radii (1970/2)
 Dzarin Bess Ga Khorim (1972)
 Just (1972)
 Heavy Aspirations (1973)
 Seatbelt Seatbelt (1973)
 Roussier (not Rouffier) (1973)
 Mugic (1973)
 she and she (1974)
 Muchrooms (1974)
 Mahogany Ballpark (1976)
 Dutiful Ducks (1977) †
 Dreams Freud Dreamed (1979)
 Egusquiza to Falsetto (chamber ensemble with tape, with Margaret Fisher, 1979)
 Church Car (1980) †
 Nite Traps (1981)
 Dot Bunch (1981)
 Hypothetical Moments (In the Intellectual Life of Southern California, 1981)
 Maroa (1981) †
 Too True (1982) †
 Dog of Stravinsky (1982)
 Andas (1982)†
 The Real Perpetuum Mobile (1984)
 Gold and Spirit (1984)
 Metropolis San Francisco (1985-6)
 Dumbek Bookache (1986) †
 Walking Tune (A Room-Music for Percy Grainger, 1986–87)
 His Anxious Hours (chamber ensemble with tape, 1987)
 Pas de Voix (Portrait of Samuel Beckett, 1987)
 Politics as Usual (1988)
 Never Say Die (1989)
 Im Frühling (1990)
 Vers Les Anges (for Nicolas Slonimsky, 1990)
 Bajanoom (1990)
 Loudspeakers (for Morton Feldman, 1990)
 A Berkelium Canon (1991, with Henry Kaiser)
 Chu Lu Lu (1992)
 Ka Himeni Hehena (The Raving Mad Hymn, 1997) †
 Miatsoom (1994–97)
 Son of Metropolis San Francisco (1997)
 Marathon (1997) †
 Octet for Ratchets (amplified percussion ensemble, 1998)
 Pianola (Pas de mains, 1997–2000)
 Mqsical Lou (2003)
 Rippling the Lamp (violin and tape, 2006–7)
 Quince Quinoa (2007) †
 Audible Autopsy (2021) (solo string bass and offstage interviewer)
 Ratchet Attach It (2021) (9 percussion with tape)

References

External links 
Golden, Barbara. "Conversation with Charles Amirkhanian." eContact! 12.2 – Interviews (2) (April 2010). Montréal: Canadian Electroacoustic Community.
Other Minds: Amirkhanian
American Maverick: An interview with Charles Amirkhanian by Alan Baker, Minnesota Public Radio, June 2002.
CDeMUSIC: Charles Amirkhanian
Walking Tune Starkland CD
Starkland compilation CD
Interview by Mark Alburger, "Dinner in the Loop with Charles Amirkhanian". 20th Century Music, Vol. 4, No. 5, May 1997.
“Other Minds’ Finds,” Jeff Dunn, San Francisco Classical Voice, February 25, 2009.
“Future Sounds: The Other Minds Festival Gears Up,” Georgia Rowe, San Francisco Classical Voice, March 1, 2011.
“Other Minds Festival: Connecting to Composers,” Brett Campbell, San Francisco Classical Voice, February 16, 2012.
“Out of This World, Ahead of Time: Conlon Nancarrow,” Brett Campbell, San Francisco Classical Voice, October 31, 2012.
“4,000 KPFA/OM Tapes Online: Yours for the Click,” Janos Gereben, San Francisco Classical Voice, July 9, 2013.
“Exploring Depths in Other Minds,” Jeff Kaliss, San Francisco Classical Voice, February 12, 2013.
“Other Minds 2015 Merges Art and Politics, Jason Victor Serinus, San Francisco Classical Voice, March 6, 2015.
“Playful Music Captures Other Minds’ Spirit,” Giacomo Fiore, San Francisco Classical Voice, March 10, 2015.
“The Arditti Quartet Champions the Maximalist Microtonality of Ivan Wyschnegradsky,” Rebecca Wishnia, San Francisco Classical Voice, March 25, 2019.
“From the East Bay, Charles Amirkhanian gives us a new soundtrack of San Francisco,” Joshua Kosman, San Francisco Chronicle, January 14, 2020.
“Keeping up with Charles Amirkhanian,” Jeff Kaliss, San Francisco Classical Voice, October 19, 2020.
“Growing New Music with Other Minds,” Lou Fancher, San Francisco Classical Voice, January 21, 2020.
“Improvisation Drives the Other Minds Festival This Year,” Emily Wilson, San Francisco Classical Voice, October 12, 2021.
“At Other Minds, Experimental Music Is Serious Fun,” San Francisco Classical Voice, October 11, 2022.
"On Screen: Films and DVDs," The Wire, Issue 469, March 2023, pg 78.

Listening 
Art of the States, three works by Charles Amirkhanian
UbuWeb: Charles Amirkhanian featuring music from Amirkhanian's LP Mental Radio
Riding the Meridian: Ka Himeni Hehena, Sound/Text by Charles Amirkhanian
Author page at Lyrikline.org, with audio and text.

American classical composers
American public radio personalities
American radio producers
American sound artists
Sound poets
1945 births
Living people
American male classical composers
American people of Armenian descent
Pacifica Foundation people
Musicians from Fresno, California
20th-century classical composers
21st-century classical composers
21st-century American composers
20th-century American composers
20th-century American male musicians
21st-century American male musicians
Centaur Records artists